The centrolinead was invented by Peter Nicholson, a British mathematician and architect, in 1814. It was used to construct 2-point perspective drawings where one or both vanishing points existed outside the drawing board. Draftsmen could use the instrument in pairs; one for each vanishing point on each side of the station point.

Centrolineads were produced in various sizes. Typically a brass fitting clamped the wooden arms together. Fittings were produced in both right and left-handed configuration, and certain adjustable designs could be used on either side.

Usage 
Two short arms are set to form 90 degree angles against a third, longer drawing edge. Pins are placed near the edges of the drawing surface and serve as pivots for the arms. Pin placement is equidistant and symmetric across the horizontal line. A third centrolinead could be used to construct 3-point perspective.

The diagram shown above does not represent the centrolinead designed by Nicholson.

Further reading 
 Centrolineads and their use are discussed in W.F. Stanley's book on mathematical instruments.

References

External links
Yahoo! Groups

Technical drawing tools